Mărtiniș (Hungarian pronunciation: , meaning "St. Martin of Homorod") is a commune in Harghita County, Romania. It lies in the Székely Land, an ethno-cultural region in eastern Transylvania.

Component villages 

The commune is composed of twelve villages:

History 

The village seems to have been inhabited already in prehistoric times as a neolithic ax and an urn was found in the outskirts of the village some decades ago. Roman coins were also unearthed in the village and a small lake reminiscent of the place of an abandoned salt mine suggest that it was also inhabited in Roman times

The village gained its name, when King Géza II of Hungary founded settlements in the Great-Homorod Valley in the middle of the 12th century. The first settlement is thought to be destroyed by the Mongols in 1241. This is supported by the fact that all the churches of the Homorod area were built in a style which is characteristic for the era following the Mongol Invasion. The village is first recorded in a diploma from 1333 when a sacerdos de Sancto Martino was mentioned. In 1487, it is recorded as Zenthmarton, while in 1636, it appears already as Homorod-Szent-Marton. Its Romanian name derives from the Hungarian one and it had at first been Homorod-Sânmărtin and was later changed to the current official name. Its medieval church consecrated in honour of St Martin was built in the 13th century and was altered in the 15th century in late-Gothic style. As the village suffered a Tartar attack in 1613, the church was surrounded by a fortified wall strengthened by six towers. Between 1714-1719, the population was struck by plague. Although, the mediaeval church was pulled down in 1888, the gate-tower of the fortified wall was spared and it now serves as the bell tower of  the new Unitarian church built in 1889.

The villages forming the commune administratively belonged to Udvarhelyszék, then, from 1876 until 1918 to Homoród district of Udvarhely County in the Kingdom of Hungary. In 1920, the village, like the rest of Transylvania, formally passed with the Treaty of Trianon from Hungarian to Romanian control. In 1940, the second Vienna Award granted the Northern Transylvania to Hungary and the villages were held by Hungary until 1944. After Soviet occupation, the Romanian administration returned and the commune became officially part of Romania in 1947. Between 1952 and 1960, the commune fell within the Magyar Autonomous Region, between 1960 and 1968 the Mureș-Magyar Autonomous Region. In 1968, the province was abolished, and since then, the commune has been part of Harghita County.

Demographics
At the 2011 census, the commune had a population of 2,838; out of them, 97% were Hungarian, 1.3% were Romanian and 0.2% were Roma. 67% of the commune population are Unitarian, 14% are Reformed and 13% are Roman Catholic.

Landmarks 
The Unitarian Church was built in 1889, however, the gate-tower of the 17th century fortified wall was turned into its bell tower
The Reformed Church was built in 1804 on a plot donated by the Bíró and Ugron families,
In the village can be found the largest mansion house of the area, the mansion of the Bíró family. Chronicles from the Middle Ages already record a mansion house on the site. There is a vaulted cellar under the building built of stone, brick and hot lime which  successfully resisted the storms of history. Several rooms, including a large dining-room can be seen in the building. The Ugron family inherited the mansion in the second half of the 18th century, and it was between 1780-1790 that the building gained its current appearance in Rococo style,
The family vault of the Bíró-family is south-east of the village in a small settlement called Bükkfalva

Notable people
 Jakab Molnár (1926–1991), writer
 Elemér Mezei (1954-), mathematician
 Viktor Román (1937–1995), sculptor
 János Szentmártoni Bodó, poet
 Berta Kelemenné Zathureczky (1855–1924), writer
 Aladár Zoltán (1929–1978), composer

Twinnings 
The commune is twinned with:
 Dunavecse, Hungary
 Zsámbék, Hungary

References

External links 
 
Unitarian Church of Homoródszentmárton 
Pictures of the village (Unitarian picture gallery)

Communes in Harghita County
Localities in Transylvania
Székely communities